Maksym Radziwill is a Polish-Canadian mathematician specializing in number theory. He is currently a professor of mathematics at the California Institute of Technology.

Life 
Radziwill graduated from McGill University in Montreal in 2009, and in 2013 earned a PhD under  Kannan Soundararajan at Stanford University in California. In 2013–2014, he was at the Institute for Advanced Study in Princeton, New Jersey as a visiting member, and in 2014 became a Hill assistant professor at Rutgers University. In 2016, he became an assistant professor at McGill.  In 2018, he became Professor of Mathematics at California Institute of Technology, and in 2022 he moved to the University of Texas at Austin.

Honors and awards 

In 2016, along with Kaisa Matomäki of the University of Turku, Radziwill was awarded the SASTRA Ramanujan Prize.

In February 2017, Maksym Radziwill was awarded the prestigious Sloan Fellowship.

In 2018, he was awarded the Coxeter–James Prize by the Canadian Mathematical Society. In 2018 he was invited with Matomäki to present their work at the International Congress of Mathematicians.

With Matomäki, he is one of five winners of the 2019 New Horizons Prize for Early-Career Achievement in Mathematics, associated with the Breakthrough Prize in Mathematics.
In the same year he was awarded the Stefan Banach Prize by the Polish Mathematical Society.  For 2023 he received the Cole Prize in Number Theory of the AMS.

References

1988 births
Living people
Number theorists
Recipients of the SASTRA Ramanujan Prize
Canadian mathematicians
Polish mathematicians